Pelli Pustakam is a 1991 Telugu-language romantic comedy film, produced by Mullapudi Venkata Ramana under the Sri Seetarama Films banner and directed by Bapu. It stars Rajendra Prasad, Divyavani and music composed by K. V. Mahadevan. The film won three Nandi Awards, and was premiered in Indian Panorama section at the International Film Festival of India. This movie has a resemblance to the 1955 classic movie Missamma.

Plot
K. Krishna Murthy / KK works as an art director in Mumbai and his new wife Satyabhama / Bhama works as a stenographer in Kerala for a low salary. To solve their financial problems, they seek a job in a big company and pretend to be unmarried as their boss Sridhar Rao would give job only to one member of a family. So the couple lies that they are unmarried and joins in the company. Sridhar Rao's only daughter Vasundhara / Vasu starts liking KK and moves close with him, which makes Bhama jealous and suspect her husband's character. Parallelly, Sridhar Rao's brother-in-law Giri flirts Bhama and tries to trap her. This leads to destruction and disturbances in KK and Bhama's marriage. Rest of the story is how the couple overcome all these problems and make everyone realize the greatness of marriage.

Cast
 Rajendra Prasad as K. Krishna Murthy / KK
 Divyavani as Satyabhama / Bhama
 Sindhuja as Vasundhara / Vasu
 Gummadi as Sridhar Rao
 Subhalekha Sudhakar as Giri Babu
 Sakshi Ranga Rao as KK's father
 Raavi Kondala Rao as Babai
 Ananth as Co-Employee
 Ashok Kumar as Keemoji / Krishnaji
 Dharmavarapu Subramanyam
 Radha Kumari as Bhama's mother
 Jhansi as Vasundhara's mother

Soundtrack

Music composed by K. V. Mahadevan. Lyrics were written by Arudra, except for the traditional Carnatic compositions Krishnam Kalaya Sakhi and Jagadanandakaraka, by Sri Narayana Teertha and Tyagaraja respectively. Music released on AKASH Audio Company.

Awards
Nandi Awards
Second Best Feature Film -  Silver  - Mullapudi Venkata Ramana
Best Dialogue Writer - Mullapudi Venkata Ramana
Best Story Writer - Raavi Kondala Rao

References

External links
 
 Idlebrain review

1991 films
Indian feminist films
Films about social issues in India
Films about women in India
Social realism in film
Films shot in Hyderabad, India
Films with screenplays by Mullapudi Venkata Ramana
Films about Indian weddings
Films directed by Bapu
Films scored by K. V. Mahadevan
1990s Telugu-language films